Vo Thi My Linh is a writer in Vietnam and founder of Volunteer House Vietnam. She was known in her country after surviving and writing about an avalanche in Nepal on October 14, 2014.

She became even more prominent after a letter to the Minister of Education in which she advocated for increased English educational programs in her developing country.

In 2015, Linh published her first novel "Over the Hill" (Vietnamese: Bên kia đồi)  after being co-author of ten books of short stories for teenagers. This novel received good reviews from critics.

She also is the Founder of Volunteer House Vietnam. This is a non-profit organization established for the purpose of connecting generous and talented travelers and children eager to learn English in Vietnam.

Life story

Linh was born and raised in Central Vietnam. Her father was a bomb sawyer. Harvesting bombs after the war was a means of survival in her village. Bombs were sawed to extract the TNT inside, which was used to catch fish. The outer shells were sold to recyclers as scrap metal. 
Her father was injured by a bomb on a nearby hill. He needed a corneal graft and it took him 6 months to recover.
The bomb accident tore her family apart, causing numerous events later. "It was not a big deal though", Linh said. "The big deal is that every year, around 4,000 people in Vietnam are severely injured and die due to accidents with explosives. The danger is not a deterrent for bomb sawyers, who regard it as their only source of income.  It is ridiculous, isn't it?"
"

Nepal avalanche survivor

The avalanche killed at least 43 people out of a total 168 trekkers on the Annapurna mountain in 2014. Linh managed to survive and also helped a porter to save his life. Linh said the reason that made everybody go trekking is, "Sometimes, life is a pile of shit. To find faith, somebody has to climb up the mountain to see a flower which blooms on stone and realize that life is still beautiful."

When young people admired her, Linh reminded them "Climbing a mountain doesn't mean you are strong. The women, who stay at home and take care of their family every day, are really strong women."

Letter to the Minister of Education

Being someone who was once poor at English, Linh knew the disadvantages facing people who can't speak English. When Linh went to Aruchour village – a remote area in Nepal to do volunteer work - she found out people over there speak English very well although they are very poor. Linh spent a whole day in the library of a primary school reading a Nepalese English textbook. Then, she made a comparison with the English textbooks in Vietnam and realized there was something wrong in the English textbooks for Vietnamese students. She then wrote a letter to the Minister of Education. After publishing it on Facebook, the letter received more than 24.000 "Like" clicks and more than 10.000 "Share" clicks and later went viral. Linh said, "I still don't know why people appreciated me after that. I suppose that anybody can write a letter like me, to say anything they want to say. That was not bravery. That was a type of freedom of speech."

Founder of Volunteer House Vietnam 

Volunteer House Vietnam is a non-profit organization which provides free accommodations for foreign travelers in exchange for free English lessons for underprivileged children. VHV's goal is to set up at least one free English class in each province of Vietnam by 2020 for children, especially for disadvantaged ones from 9–12 years old, to be taught by our volunteers and travelers.

In explaining the reason why she chooses English as the focus of her project, Linh recalled her time in Nepal, saying people there were in deep poverty, living without the Internet, TV or phones but spoke English very well.
"As a person who is not very good at English, I see those who are good at the language having the chance to land well-paid jobs in Vietnam," she added. "I don't want language to be a barrier for Vietnamese people."
"Our target is not how many VHV students we teach but raising people's awareness of how important English is," Linh stated. "When people understand the language's importance, they will learn it voluntarily."

Volunteer House Vietnam has so far obtained significant results: Over 2000 volunteers from over the country have registered to be its members; 80 free accommodations from 20 provinces of Vietnam have been offered to Volunteer House Vietnam, 4 English classes in Ho Chi Minh City and 4 English classes in Hanoi were established.

With the growth of volunteers and the support from the community, Linh believes that Vietnamese children can confidently communicate in English - which is the key for them to open the door to the world in the near future.

Writer

Linh started writing at an early age and became a journalist, a novelist and co-author of 10 books for teenagers. Linh said, her first writing was a divorce agreement for her mother, which, in her thought, was the only way to help protect her mother from being beaten by her father. Domestic violence is common in the countryside of Vietnam but many women - including her mother - are reluctant to divorce their husbands, as they are afraid of people judging them and assume that domestic violence is normal. After being co-author of ten books of short stories for teenagers, Linh has recently published her first novel "Over the Hill" (Vietnamese: Bên kia đồi)  This novel received good reviews from critics.
This novel talks about a character named Nu. Nu is a special kid who always had a different perspective from the majority. Nu's house is nearby a hill. She wanted to climb on the hill to see something but many old folks in her village told her not to because a lot of souls of soldiers who died in the American war were there. Nu was scared but she still kept the thought in her mind that she would go there one day. When Nu grew up, she saw most of the people around her had a humdrum life. They accepted what they had and did not want to change. NU lost faith in people. Then she decided to quit her job to travel. She hoped she could find some good things in India. Nu met many types of people on the way. She became a good friend with a monk. The monk attempt to rape her later. Nu run away from him. The journey took Nu back to Vietnam, to the village where Nu grew up. This time, she decided to climb to the top of the hill. She looked over the hillside but didn't see anything, not even a ghost, nor a beautiful flower there. However, when she looked back, she found out her village was very beautiful from that view. That was also the time Nu realized that she has grown up and been more mature. The village did not change after many years. If Nu were a kid again, she would have found it ugly. When people are mature, they try to comply and accept things easier.

Comments

About the letter for the minister
The Former Deputy Prime Minister in Vietnam, Mr. Vu Khoan, shared: "I really had a strong impression about Linh. When her letter became famous on the social network, somebody blamed the Minister of Education due to that. However, when she gave an interview, Linh said, "I don't want to blame the Minister because my English was not good. I blame myself first because I didn't try everything to learn it. Don't blame anyone if you can't take ownership over your own life. My father taught me "Your life is yours, not mine!"

Dr. Nguyen Lan Dung – a professor who is teaching biology said: "I agree with Linh's points about English in Vietnam. If Linh studied Biology, I would be willing to invite her for some type of collaboration."

Le Thanh Phong – a senior journalist in Vietnam said: "The letter which is from Linh attracted people because of the beauty inside her heart. That is her awareness of civic responsibility. A young girl quit her job to travel but not for sightseeing. She spent her time to study the English textbooks of another country to find the good things from there and told that to the Vietnamese people. There are many people who are more fluent in English than Linh but nobody promotes English the same way, because they didn't think it was their responsibility. Many people complain about a lack of patriotism. Nevertheless, they still wind up neglecting their country."

About her novel: "Over the hill" 

Mr. Phan Nhat Chieu – the literary critic – the researcher of literature and the translator wrote: "This novel is like the prelude of the piece of music which is full of excitement, strong personality, and experience along with the natural, deep-lying and profound tone of the book.

Ms. Ho Huong Giang - the book reviewer of the Vietnamnet Online Newspaper wrote:
"The fascination of this novel is, everything from society truthfully appeared through the view of the kid like the kid who was in "The emperor's new clothes" of the Hans Christian Andersen. That kid is the only person to dare to speak out what he think in front of everybody. In this novel, Nu - a kid who has a lot of questions, found out many defects of the adults around her. That's why she left her country. However, finally she had to return and accepted those. And at that time she found out she was an adult."

Rorary Peace Fellow
In 2018, Linh received a full scholarship at Duke University where she focused on International Development policy. The scholarship was sponsored by Rotary Foundation. During her time in the US, Linh was actively engaged with Rotary's Clubs and she was invited to be a guest speaker for numerous clubs and conferences with Rotary.

References

21st-century Vietnamese women writers
Living people
1989 births
Vietnamese novelists
Women novelists
21st-century novelists
People from Thừa Thiên-Huế province